Howard Elton Lacey (February 9, 1937 in Leakey, Texas – June 21, 2013) was an American mathematician who studied analysis.

Lacey graduated from Texas A&M University and Abilene Christian University with a bachelor's degree in mathematics in 1959 and a master's degree in 1960. He graduated from New Mexico State University with Edward Thorp for his PhD (Generalized Compact Operators in Locally Convex Spaces) and was then Assistant Professor at Abilene Christian University. From 1964 he was a professor at the University of Texas. In 1980 he became a professor at Texas A&M University, where he chaired the mathematics department for eleven years. He was Associate Dean of Science for one year and retired in 2002.

His specialty was Banach spaces. He also worked a lot with Polish scientists, including 1972/73 as a Fulbright Fellow at the Polish Academy of Sciences in Warsaw. He also worked in applied research at the White Sands Missile Range and at the Man Space Craft Center in Houston.

He had been married to Bonnie Brown since 1958, whom he met while he was on a summer job with the Army Corps of Engineers in Mississippi in 1957.

References

External links 
 Obituary, Austin American Statesman, June 27, 2013

1937 births
2013 deaths
American mathematicians
People from Real County, Texas